Defending champion Jimmy Connors defeated Ivan Lendl in a rematch of the previous year's final, 6–3, 6–7(2–7), 7–5, 6–0 to win the men's singles tennis title at the 1983 US Open. It was Connors' 100th ATP singles title.

Seeds
The seeded players are listed below. Jimmy Connors is the champion; others show the round in which they were eliminated.

Draw

Finals

Section 1

Section 2

Section 3

Section 4

Section 5

Section 6

Section 7

Section 8

External links
 Association of Tennis Professionals (ATP) – 1983 US Open Men's Singles draw
1983 US Open – Men's draws and results at the International Tennis Federation

Men's singles
US Open (tennis) by year – Men's singles